Calathus erratus is a species of ground beetle from the Platyninae subfamily that can be found everywhere in Europe except for Andorra, Belarus, Monaco, San Marino, Vatican City and various islands.

References

erratus
Beetles described in 1827
Beetles of Europe